The Singapore women's national volleyball team represents Singapore in international women's volleyball competitions and friendly matches.

They qualified for the 1987 Asian Women's Volleyball Championship.

Competition history

Southeast Asian Games
 1981 – "'Bronze Medal"'
 1983 – Group Stage
 1993 – Group Stage
 2015 –  Bronze medal
 2017 – Withdrew

References
Singapore Volleyball Federation

National women's volleyball teams
Volleyball
Volleyball in Singapore